WGCO (98.3 FM, "Hot 98-3") is a commercial radio station licensed to Midway, Georgia. Owned by Dick Broadcasting, it broadcasts a contemporary hit radio format targeted towards Savannah and Brunswick. Its studios are in Savannah, while the transmitter is near Townsend, Georgia.

History
The station signed on the air on as a class A gospel station licensed to Jesup called WSOJ. In 1982, the station flipped (along with many others) to an audio simulcast of the new CNN Headline News. Shortly thereafter, the station went off the air. Gospel returned to the station in 1984, then country WAJS "The Great 98" a year later. Within a few months, the station became AC WZKS "Kiss FM". In 1989, the station's tower was moved to McIntosh County, closer to Savannah and began broadcasting oldies as "Oldies 98.3", and later "98.3 Cool FM" as the current call-letters WGCO.

In 2005, the station flipped to an adult hits format under the Jack FM brand.  On March 16, 2007, the station dropped the Jack FM format and returned to the oldies format once again, as the former name since 1989 as "Oldies 98.3" after a 'protest' was held by then-former morning host Chuck "Boom Boom" Cannon asking for the return of Oldies 98.3.  On September 24, 2007, WGCO switched to a classic hits format as Big 98.3, playing a  variety of songs from roughly 1964–1985, with the core being the 1970s.

On August 29, 2013, the station dropped the classic hits format and began stunting with a loop of Hank Williams Jr.'s "All My Rowdy Friends Are Coming Over Tonight", leading into a flip to classic country 98.3 Hank FM the next day.

In September 2017, Dick Broadcasting announced that it would acquire Alpha Media's clusters in Savannah,  Kinston/New Bern/Jacksonville, and Myrtle Beach. Under the terms of the sale, however, a formal sale filing will not be made for the Savannah stations until August 2019, with Dick operating these stations under a local marketing agreement in the meantime.

On May 25, 2018, the station began stunting with a heartbeat sound, and teasing that "something hot" was coming. On May 28, 2018, the station flipped to contemporary hit radio as Hot 98.3. The station will compete primarily with iHeartMedia's WAEV, giving it its first direct competitor since the flip of sister station WXYY to classic hip-hop.

See also
List of radio stations in Georgia (U.S. state)
Lists of radio stations in North and Central America

References

External links

Contemporary hit radio stations in the United States
GCO